This is a partial list of unnumbered minor planets for principal provisional designations assigned during 1–15 November 2003. , a total of 42 bodies remain unnumbered for this period. Objects for this year are listed on the following pages: A–E · F–G · H–L · M–R · Si · Sii · Siii · Siv · T · Ui · Uii · Uiii · Uiv · V · Wi · Wii and X–Y. Also see previous and next year.

V 

|- id="2003 VJ" bgcolor=#FA8072
| 2 || 2003 VJ || MCA || 18.0 || data-sort-value="0.75" | 750 m || multiple || 2003–2017 || 28 Dec 2017 || 77 || align=left | Disc.: Piszkéstető Stn.Alt.: 2010 VD171, 2010 VZ176 || 
|- id="2003 VD1" bgcolor=#FA8072
| 0 ||  || MCA || 16.9 || 1.8 km || multiple || 2003–2021 || 08 Jan 2021 || 320 || align=left | Disc.: LINEAR || 
|- id="2003 VE1" bgcolor=#FFC2E0
| 1 ||  || APO || 19.3 || data-sort-value="0.49" | 490 m || multiple || 2003–2020 || 24 Jan 2020 || 79 || align=left | Disc.: LINEARPotentially hazardous object || 
|- id="2003 VO1" bgcolor=#FA8072
| 0 ||  || MCA || 18.9 || data-sort-value="0.70" | 700 m || multiple || 2003–2021 || 06 Jan 2021 || 182 || align=left | Disc.: LINEARAlt.: 2020 PN2 || 
|- id="2003 VP1" bgcolor=#fefefe
| 2 ||  || MBA-I || 18.5 || data-sort-value="0.59" | 590 m || multiple || 2003–2017 || 24 Nov 2017 || 36 || align=left | Disc.: LINEAR || 
|- id="2003 VM2" bgcolor=#fefefe
| 2 ||  || MBA-I || 17.9 || data-sort-value="0.78" | 780 m || multiple || 2003–2017 || 20 Dec 2017 || 84 || align=left | Disc.: NEATAlt.: 2010 PT7 || 
|- id="2003 VA3" bgcolor=#FA8072
| 0 ||  || MCA || 16.9 || 2.9 km || multiple || 2003–2021 || 18 Jan 2021 || 265 || align=left | Disc.: NEAT || 
|- id="2003 VF3" bgcolor=#d6d6d6
| 3 ||  || MBA-O || 17.2 || 2.0 km || multiple || 2003–2020 || 05 Dec 2020 || 35 || align=left | Disc.: SpacewatchAdded on 17 January 2021 || 
|- id="2003 VT3" bgcolor=#E9E9E9
| 0 ||  || MBA-M || 16.96 || 1.7 km || multiple || 2003–2022 || 27 Jan 2022 || 157 || align=left | Disc.: SpacewatchAlt.: 2015 MN45 || 
|- id="2003 VP4" bgcolor=#E9E9E9
| 0 ||  || MBA-M || 17.1 || 1.6 km || multiple || 2003–2021 || 06 Jan 2021 || 134 || align=left | Disc.: SpacewatchAlt.: 2014 HO29 || 
|- id="2003 VZ4" bgcolor=#E9E9E9
| 0 ||  || MBA-M || 17.8 || data-sort-value="0.82" | 820 m || multiple || 2003–2021 || 14 Jan 2021 || 59 || align=left | Disc.: SpacewatchAlt.: 2015 PW209 || 
|- id="2003 VR5" bgcolor=#fefefe
| 0 ||  || MBA-I || 18.3 || data-sort-value="0.65" | 650 m || multiple || 2003–2021 || 05 Jan 2021 || 142 || align=left | Disc.: SpacewatchAdded on 19 October 2020 || 
|- id="2003 VY6" bgcolor=#fefefe
| 0 ||  || MBA-I || 18.8 || data-sort-value="0.52" | 520 m || multiple || 1992–2021 || 08 Sep 2021 || 48 || align=left | Disc.: SpacewatchAdded on 30 September 2021Alt.: 2021 PU45 || 
|- id="2003 VB7" bgcolor=#E9E9E9
| 0 ||  || MBA-M || 17.50 || 1.8 km || multiple || 2003–2021 || 09 Sep 2021 || 53 || align=left | Disc.: Spacewatch || 
|- id="2003 VC7" bgcolor=#d6d6d6
| 0 ||  || MBA-O || 16.2 || 3.2 km || multiple || 2003–2020 || 17 Dec 2020 || 87 || align=left | Disc.: SpacewatchAlt.: 2014 UT96 || 
|- id="2003 VH7" bgcolor=#fefefe
| 0 ||  || MBA-I || 17.5 || data-sort-value="0.94" | 940 m || multiple || 2003–2021 || 04 Jan 2021 || 183 || align=left | Disc.: SpacewatchAlt.: 2011 AG13, 2015 HP180 || 
|- id="2003 VK7" bgcolor=#fefefe
| 0 ||  || MBA-I || 18.78 || data-sort-value="0.52" | 520 m || multiple || 2003–2021 || 09 Dec 2021 || 61 || align=left | Disc.: SpacewatchAlt.: 2010 NX62 || 
|- id="2003 VV7" bgcolor=#FA8072
| 1 ||  || HUN || 18.4 || data-sort-value="0.62" | 620 m || multiple || 2003–2020 || 25 Jan 2020 || 117 || align=left | Disc.: NEAT || 
|- id="2003 VJ8" bgcolor=#E9E9E9
| 0 ||  || MBA-M || 16.16 || 3.3 km || multiple || 2003–2021 || 17 Dec 2021 || 252 || align=left | Disc.: NEATAlt.: 2012 UC21 || 
|- id="2003 VB9" bgcolor=#E9E9E9
| 0 ||  || MBA-M || 16.8 || 1.8 km || multiple || 2003–2020 || 19 Aug 2020 || 100 || align=left | Disc.: LPL/Spacewatch IIAlt.: 2015 HG89 || 
|- id="2003 VR12" bgcolor=#E9E9E9
| 0 ||  || MBA-M || 17.41 || 1.8 km || multiple || 2003–2021 || 03 Oct 2021 || 92 || align=left | Disc.: Spacewatch || 
|- id="2003 VS12" bgcolor=#fefefe
| 0 ||  || MBA-I || 17.9 || data-sort-value="0.78" | 780 m || multiple || 2003–2020 || 20 Oct 2020 || 105 || align=left | Disc.: NEAT || 
|- id="2003 VU12" bgcolor=#d6d6d6
| 0 ||  || MBA-O || 16.15 || 3.3 km || multiple || 2003–2021 || 31 May 2021 || 141 || align=left | Disc.: SDSSAlt.: 2010 KL82 || 
|- id="2003 VV12" bgcolor=#d6d6d6
| 0 ||  || MBA-O || 17.20 || 2.0 km || multiple || 2003–2021 || 09 May 2021 || 67 || align=left | Disc.: SDSS || 
|- id="2003 VW12" bgcolor=#fefefe
| 1 ||  || HUN || 18.7 || data-sort-value="0.54" | 540 m || multiple || 2003–2019 || 15 Dec 2019 || 46 || align=left | Disc.: SDSS || 
|- id="2003 VX12" bgcolor=#fefefe
| 0 ||  || MBA-I || 18.8 || data-sort-value="0.52" | 520 m || multiple || 2003–2021 || 18 Jan 2021 || 47 || align=left | Disc.: Spacewatch || 
|- id="2003 VY12" bgcolor=#fefefe
| 0 ||  || HUN || 18.80 || data-sort-value="0.52" | 520 m || multiple || 2003–2021 || 31 Oct 2021 || 84 || align=left | Disc.: SDSS || 
|- id="2003 VZ12" bgcolor=#d6d6d6
| 1 ||  || MBA-O || 16.4 || 2.9 km || multiple || 2003–2020 || 11 Dec 2020 || 54 || align=left | Disc.: LPL/Spacewatch II || 
|- id="2003 VB13" bgcolor=#E9E9E9
| 0 ||  || MBA-M || 17.5 || data-sort-value="0.94" | 940 m || multiple || 2003–2019 || 02 Oct 2019 || 54 || align=left | Disc.: Spacewatch || 
|- id="2003 VC13" bgcolor=#fefefe
| 2 ||  || MBA-I || 17.9 || data-sort-value="0.78" | 780 m || multiple || 2003–2020 || 15 Dec 2020 || 62 || align=left | Disc.: SDSS || 
|- id="2003 VE13" bgcolor=#fefefe
| 0 ||  || MBA-I || 18.1 || data-sort-value="0.71" | 710 m || multiple || 2003–2018 || 14 Aug 2018 || 37 || align=left | Disc.: Tenagra II Obs. || 
|- id="2003 VF13" bgcolor=#d6d6d6
| 0 ||  || MBA-O || 17.0 || 2.2 km || multiple || 2003–2019 || 24 Dec 2019 || 48 || align=left | Disc.: Spacewatch || 
|- id="2003 VG13" bgcolor=#E9E9E9
| 0 ||  || MBA-M || 16.8 || 1.8 km || multiple || 2003–2021 || 17 Jan 2021 || 90 || align=left | Disc.: Ondřejov Obs. || 
|- id="2003 VJ13" bgcolor=#d6d6d6
| 0 ||  || MBA-O || 17.1 || 2.1 km || multiple || 2003–2019 || 03 Jul 2019 || 28 || align=left | Disc.: La Palma Obs. || 
|- id="2003 VK13" bgcolor=#fefefe
| 0 ||  || MBA-I || 19.0 || data-sort-value="0.47" | 470 m || multiple || 2003–2017 || 16 Nov 2017 || 37 || align=left | Disc.: Spacewatch || 
|- id="2003 VL13" bgcolor=#d6d6d6
| 0 ||  || MBA-O || 16.99 || 2.2 km || multiple || 2003–2021 || 10 Apr 2021 || 71 || align=left | Disc.: Spacewatch || 
|- id="2003 VM13" bgcolor=#d6d6d6
| 0 ||  || MBA-O || 17.6 || 1.7 km || multiple || 2003–2019 || 26 Nov 2019 || 32 || align=left | Disc.: Spacewatch || 
|- id="2003 VN13" bgcolor=#d6d6d6
| 0 ||  || HIL || 16.9 || 2.3 km || multiple || 2003–2019 || 04 Dec 2019 || 29 || align=left | Disc.: LPL/Spacewatch II || 
|- id="2003 VO13" bgcolor=#fefefe
| 0 ||  || MBA-I || 18.22 || data-sort-value="0.67" | 670 m || multiple || 2003–2022 || 27 Jan 2022 || 134 || align=left | Disc.: SpacewatchAdded on 22 July 2020 || 
|- id="2003 VP13" bgcolor=#E9E9E9
| 0 ||  || MBA-M || 18.1 || 1.0 km || multiple || 2003–2020 || 15 Sep 2020 || 34 || align=left | Disc.: SpacewatchAdded on 17 January 2021 || 
|- id="2003 VQ13" bgcolor=#E9E9E9
| 0 ||  || MBA-M || 17.5 || 1.3 km || multiple || 2003–2021 || 07 Feb 2021 || 49 || align=left | Disc.: SpacewatchAdded on 17 January 2021 || 
|- id="2003 VS13" bgcolor=#fefefe
| 2 ||  || MBA-I || 19.6 || data-sort-value="0.36" | 360 m || multiple || 2003–2021 || 30 Oct 2021 || 29 || align=left | Disc.: SpacewatchAdded on 5 November 2021 || 
|}
back to top

References 
 

Lists of unnumbered minor planets